Valuyevka is a rural locality (a selo) and the administrative center of Valuyevskoye Rural Settlement, Staropoltavsky District, Volgograd Oblast, Russia. The population was 1,071 as of 2010. There are 7 streets.

Geography 
Valuyevka is located 21 km southwest of Staraya Poltavka (the district's administrative centre) by road. Shpaki is the nearest rural locality.

References 

Rural localities in Staropoltavsky District